Frank White may refer to:

Politics
 Francis S. White (1847–1922), U.S. Senator from Alabama
 Frank White (North Dakota politician) (1856–1940), Republican politician, eighth Governor of North Dakota, Treasurer of the United States
 Frank D. White (1933–2003), Governor of Arkansas, 1981–1983
 Frank White (British politician) (born 1939), British Labour Member of Parliament for Bury and Radcliffe, 1974–1983
 Frank White (Florida politician) (born 1978), member of the Florida House of Representatives
 Frank White (Australian politician), member of the New South Wales Legislative Assembly

Sports
 Frank W. White (1880–1947), American football head coach for the Temple University Owls
 Frank White (footballer) (1911–1985), English footballer
 Frank White (hurler) (1913–1984), Irish hurler
 Frank White (baseball) (born 1950), American baseball player

Other
 Frank L. White (1867–1938), American chef best known as the model featured on Cream of Wheat cereal boxes
 Frank T. M. White (1909–1971), Australian mining and metallurgical engineer and mineral science educator
 Frank G. White (1910–2002), American general
 Frank White (botanist) (1927–1994), expert on African flora and curator of the Oxford University herbarium
 Frank White (bishop) (born 1949), Church of England priest who served as Bishop of Brixworth and Assistant Bishop of Newcastle
 Frank White, author of The Overview Effect: Space Exploration and Human Evolution and related books
 Frank White, an alias of The Notorious B.I.G. (1972–1997), American rapper
 Frank White, an alias of Fler (born 1982), German rapper
 Frank M. White, American mechanical and ocean engineer
 Frank Russell White (1889-1961), American architect

See also
 Francis White (disambiguation)
 Franklin White (born 1946), Canadian public health scientist
 Franklin White (dancer) (1923–2013), British ballet dancer